Yves Debay (24 December 1954 – 17 January 2013), was a veteran French-Belgian war correspondent, who founded and reported for the French-language magazines Raids and later Assaut (Translation: Assault), which is published out of Boulogne-Billancourt, Paris, France. He was the first Belgian journalist to be killed in Syria.

Personal
Yves Debay was born in Élisabethville, Belgian Congo (later Lubumbashi, Democratic Republic of the Congo).  He first enlisted in the Belgian army in 1975 and later was a tank commander before turning to mercenary activities. In 1987, he became a French citizen.

Career 
Yves Debay was a former soldier who later became a journalist specialising in military issues for war enthusiasts. In the late 1970s, Debay served in the Rhodesian Armoured Car Regiment during the Rhodesian Bush War, 44 Parachute Brigade in the South African army during the South African Border War and later had a career as a journalist writing for Gazette des Armes. Debay was one of the founders of Raids in 1986 and worked for the French-language magazine for over 20 years covering military and war issues. In 2005, he founded his own military magazine called Assaut, for which he served as publisher, editor and journalist. As a war correspondent, he covered wars in Afghanistan, both Iraq wars, Lebanon, the Balkans, Libya and Syria.

Death 

Little is known about the circumstances in which Debay was killed. An anonymous source, described in the media as an activist, told the French news agency Agence France-Presse (AFP), ".. it seems like he entered a very dangerous street where the army and pro-regime militia were positioned" before he was killed by a sniper. The source claimed to have deposited his body in Bab al-Salama, a border checkpoint for Northern Syria and Turkey.

Impact 
Yves Debay and Marie Colvin were among the most experienced war correspondents who were killed while covering the Syrian civil war.

Reactions 
While a hostage situation was ongoing in Algiers after France's intervention in Mali, French President François Hollande issued an official statement, "France condemns this heinous act and expresses to the family and friends of Yves Debay its condolences, sympathy and solidarity... France pays tribute to Yves Debay and other journalists who, in Syria, pay with their lives for their commitment to freedom of information."

Writings 
 Wildcat, Carnets de guerre d'un journaliste rebelle (2004).

See also 
 List of journalists killed during the Syrian civil war
 Battle of Aleppo (2012–2013)
 Lord Richard Cecil

References

External links 
 Assaut

1954 births
2013 deaths
Belgian journalists
Male journalists
Belgian mercenaries
Belgian Army officers
Belgian emigrants to France
Belgian emigrants to South Africa
Belgian expatriates in the Democratic Republic of the Congo
Foreign volunteers in the Rhodesian Security Forces
French journalists
French magazine editors
French magazine founders
French war correspondents
Journalists killed in Syria
Journalists killed while covering the Syrian civil war
People from Lubumbashi
South African military personnel of the Border War
War correspondents of the Syrian civil war
French male writers